The Islamic Financial Services Board (IFSB) is an  international standard-setting body of regulatory and supervisory agencies that promotes the soundness and stability of the Islamic financial services industry, covering banking, capital market and insurance. In advancing this mission, the IFSB promotes the development of a prudent and transparent Islamic financial services industry through introducing new, or adapting existing international standards consistent with Sharî'ah principles, and recommend them for adoption.

The IFSB was originally established to serve banking sector regulators and central banks. However, in 2004–2005, the IFSB mandate was extended to include supervisors and regulators of insurance and securities markets.

History 
The IFSB was founded by "a consortium of central banks" and the Islamic Development Bank in 2002 and began operations on 10 March 2003. The country of its location, Malaysia, passed a special law the same year —the Islamic Financial Services Board Act 2002—giving the IFSB the usual "immunities and privileges" international organizations receive.

The Nine Founding Members that signed the Articles of Agreement on 3 November 2002 are the following:

 Central Bank of Bahrain (formerly known as Bahrain Monetary Authority)
 Bank Indonesia
 Central Bank of the Islamic Republic of Iran
 Central Bank of Kuwait
 Bank Negara Malaysia
 State Bank of Pakistan
 Saudi Arabian Monetary Agency
 Central Bank of Sudan (formerly known as Bank of Sudan)
Islamic Development Bank

In its 15th Meeting held on 23 November 2009 in Kuala Lumpur, Malaysia, the Council of the IFSB resolved to establish the Islamic Financial Stability Forum as a platform for the IFSB member countries to discuss issues relating to the financial stability of the Islamic financial services industry. Prominent industry experts, senior leadership of national and international institutions  and  thought leaders have presented their papers in the Islamic Financial Stability Forum

Mission 
The mission of the IFSB is to promote the stability and resilience of the Islamic financial services industry. The IFSB seeks to achieve its mission through the issuance, and facilitating the implementation, of global and prudential and supervisory standards and other initiatives that foster knowledge sharing and cooperation.

Membership 
, the 187 members of the IFSB comprise 79 regulatory and supervisory authorities, 9 international inter-governmental organisations, and 99 market players (financial institutions, professional firms, industry associations and stock exchanges) operating in 57 jurisdictions.

Standards and Guiding Principles, Technical Notes and Guidance Notes 
As in October 2020, the IFSB has issued 32 Standards & Guiding Principles, Technical Notes and Guiding Principles for various sectors of Islamic financial services industry.

See also 
Islamic banking and finance
Accounting and Auditing Organization for Islamic Financial Institutions

References

Books

 

Non-profit organisations based in Malaysia
Financial regulation
International finance institutions